The 1941 All-Ireland Minor Hurling Championship was the 14th staging of the All-Ireland Minor Hurling Championship since its establishment by the Gaelic Athletic Association in 1928. As a result of the Emergency it was the last championship to be staged until 1945.

Limerick entered the championship as the defending champions, however, they were beaten by Clare in the Munster quarter-final.

On 28 September 1941 Cork won the championship following a 3–11 to 1–1 defeat of Galway in the All-Ireland final. This was their fifth All-Ireland title and their first in two championship seasons.

Results

Leinster Minor Hurling Championship

Final

Munster Minor Hurling Championship

Semi-finals

Final

All-Ireland Minor Hurling Championship

Semi-finals

Final

External links
 All-Ireland Minor Hurling Championship: Roll Of Honour

Minor
All-Ireland Minor Hurling Championship